The Farm 51 is a Polish video game developer founded in 2005 by Wojciech Pazdur and Kamil Bilczyński, which previously worked on the Painkiller series at People Can Fly, and Robert Siejka, former president of 3D Magazine. Originally, the company made some outsourcing contracts work for other studios, but then gathered enough IP to get funding from 1C Company for their 2009 debut project, NecroVisioN, and then its prequel, NecroVisioN: Lost Company. They were initially working on City Interactive's Alien Fear, but are no longer involved with the project. They have also released Deadfall Adventures, on 15 November 2013. Get Even was published by Bandai Namco Entertainment and released on 23 June 2017 on PC, PlayStation 4 and Xbox One. Their most recent games, Chernobylite is in development and released as an early access title on Steam on 16 October 2019 as well as World War 3 with publishers My.Games and The 4 Winds Entertainment.

Games developed

Outsourced projects 
 The Witcher (2007)
 Two Worlds II (2010)

See also 
 Painkiller
 Hatred
 People Can Fly
 1C Company

References

External links 
 
 The Farm 51 on MobyGames
 The Farm 51 on IGN
 Get Even announcement on Polygon

Video game development companies
Video game companies of Poland
Video game companies established in 2005
Gliwice
Polish companies established in 2005